WAYB-FM (95.7 FM) is a radio station  broadcasting a religious radio format. Licensed to Graysville, Tennessee, United States. The station is currently owned by Family Worship Center Church.

History
The station went on the air as WAYB on 30 August 1989. On 4 December 1992, the station changed its call sign to the current WAYB.

References

External links
http://sonlifetv.com

AYB-FM